Muhammad Faizat bin Mohamad Ghazli (born 28 November 1994) is a Malaysian professional footballer who plays as a forward for Malaysia Super League side Penang and the Malaysia national team.

Faizat is the younger brother of fellow footballer Failee Ghazli.

Club career

Harimau Muda
Faizat started his football career with Harimau Muda B in 2013 until 2015. On 25 November 2015, it was confirmed that the Harimau Muda programme has disbanded by Football Association of Malaysia which means all the player from Harimau Muda A, Harimau Muda B and Harimau Muda C will be returned to their own state.

PKNS FC
On December 2017, Faizat signed a contract with Malaysia Super League club PKNS FC after two seasons at Penang.

Kedah FA
On 16 March 2020, Faizat signed a contract with Malaysia Super League club Kedah FA.

International career
Faizat has featured in 2015 Southeast Asian Games represented Malaysia U23. He has made 4 appearances during the tournament.

Career statistics

Club

1 Includes AFC Cup and AFC Champions League.

References

External links

1994 births
Living people
Malaysian people of Malay descent
Malaysian footballers
Penang F.C. players
PKNS F.C. players
Kedah Darul Aman F.C. players
People from Penang
Association football forwards